Oncotylus vitticeps is a species of plant bugs belonging to the family Miridae, subfamily Phylinae that can be found in Russia and Ukraine.

References

Insects described in 1879
Hemiptera of Europe
Phylini